Hindi Ko Kayang Iwan Ka  (International title: Stay with Me / ) is a 2018 Philippine television drama series broadcast by GMA Network. Directed by Maryo J. de los Reyes and Neal del Rosario, it stars Yasmien Kurdi. It premiered on February 26, 2018 on the network's Afternoon Prime line up replacing Haplos. The series concluded on August 31, 2018 with a total of 132 episodes. It was replaced by My Special Tatay in its timeslot.

The series is streaming online on YouTube.

Premise
The story revolves around Thea Balagtas. After getting married and raising their twins together, her life shatters when she tests positive for HIV.

Cast and characters

Lead cast
 Yasmien Kurdi as Althea "Thea" Balagtas-Angeles

Supporting cast
 Martin del Rosario as Lawrence de Leon
 Jackie Rice as Ava Imperial
 Mike Tan as Marco Angeles
 Shamaine Buencamino as Magdalena "Magda" Balagtas
 Charee Pineda as Rosanna "Anna" Balagtas
 Ina Feleo as Sophia Angeles
 Mike "Pekto" Nacua as Tantoy Cruz
 Catherine Rem as Olga Cruz
 Caprice Cayetano as Angela B. Angeles
 Seth dela Cruz as Maurice B. Angeles
 Gina Alajar as Adelaida "Adele" Angeles

Guest cast
 Lucho Ayala as Rommel
 Paolo Gumabao as Raffy
 Ameera Johara as Nikka Martinez
 Rob Moya as Edgar Villar
 Reese Tuazon as Leila
 Lharby Policarpio as Andy
 Rodjun Cruz as Edward Salazar
 Jackie Lou Blanco as Elvira Imperial-Policarpio
 Lloyd Samartino as Manuel Policarpio
 Tonio Quiazon as Gado
 Arrian Labios as Tantoy
 Omar Flores as Bernie Silvestre
 Jeff Luna as Elvira's bodyguard
 Aleera Montalla as Tess
 Alvin Maghanoy as Dodot
 Francis Mata as Mike
 Joemarie Nielsen as Ogie
 Ces Aldaba as a doctor
 Mike Lloren as Manuel Imperial
 Eddie Ngo as a hotel tenant
 Renerich Ocon as a maid
 Star Orjaliza as a doctor
 Peggy Rico Tuazon as a doctor
 Mona Louise Rey as young Ava

Accolades

Ratings
According to AGB Nielsen Philippines' Nationwide Urban Television Audience Measurement People in television homes, the pilot episode of Hindi Ko Kayang Iwan Ka earned a 5.3% rating. The series got its highest rating on May 1, 2018 with an 8.3% rating.

References

External links
 
 

2018 Philippine television series debuts
2018 Philippine television series endings
Filipino-language television shows
GMA Network drama series
HIV/AIDS in television
Television shows set in the Philippines